Pia Lamberg (born 5 October 1990) is a Finnish actress, fashion model and beauty pageant titleholder. She was crowned Miss Finland 2011 and later she represented Finland at Miss Universe 2011 pageant on September 12, 2011 in Brazil.

Life and career
Pia Pakarinen was born on 5 October 1990 in Juuka, Finland. She changed her surname to her mother's maiden name Lamberg when she moved to the United States in the early 2010s.

She competed as one of the 10 finalists in Finland's national beauty pageant, Miss Finland 2011 broadcast live by MTV3 on 5 March 2011. She became the eventual winner of the title, gaining the right to represent Finland in the 2011 Miss Universe pageant, to be broadcast live from São Paulo, Brazil on 12 September 2011. Pakarinen resigned from the duties of Miss Finland on national TV broadcast on 16 September 2011. This was due to differences of opinions with Finnartist Oy and especially Eino Makunen. She felt she was left all alone and wasn't supported in a professional manner. After her decision Eino Makunen announced that the new Miss Finland 2011 was Sara Sieppi. 

Lamberg subsequently moved to Los Angeles to pursue a career in acting and modeling. In 2015, she signed a modeling contract with NTA Model Management in Los Angeles. Lamberg has modeled for numerous brands such as Corona, Nike, Adidas, John Frieda, Ole Henriksen, Mineral Air and Paula's Choice. She has been featured in commercials for Mercedes-Benz, Booking, Quiznos and Dave & Buster's.

In 2013, Lamberg was cast as lifeguard Heather in The CW's action-drama television series SAF3. The series followed the daily challenges of the multi-agency task force known as SAF3, which includes lifeguards, firefighters and Coast Guard officers. She was a Trophy Model at the 54th Annual Grammy Awards (2012) and the 61st Annual Grammy Awards (2019), which aired on CBS. She had small roles in television shows such as Kingdom (2014) and Tosh.0 (2018), and appeared as a model at The Queen Latifah Show (2014).

Filmography

Further reading

</ref>

References

External links
 
 Official Miss Suomi website
 

1990 births
Living people
Miss Finland winners
Miss Universe 2011 contestants
People from Joensuu
Finnish beauty pageant winners
Finnish expatriates in the United States